Hanover-Horton High School (formerly Hanover-Horton Central Secondary School) is a public secondary school located in Horton, Michigan, United States. The school serves grades 9 to 12 in the Hanover-Horton School District.

History
The Hanover Schools and Horton Schools  merged in 1958. Prior to the merger, each district consisted of one elementary and one high school.

Demographics
The demographic breakdown of the 394 students enrolled in 2014-2015 was:
Male - 53.%
Female - 46.2%
Native American/Alaskan  - 0%
Asian/Pacific islanders - 0.5%
Black - 1.0%
Hispanic - 3.6%
White - 93.4%
Multiracial - 1.5%

23.1% of the students were eligible for free or reduced priced lunch.

Arts
Hanover-Horton offers Fine Arts programs, including Concert Band, Jazz Band, Marching Band, and Choir.

Athletics
H.H. High School maintains a football team, as well as cross country, basketball, volleyball, baseball, softball, golf, track and field, soccer, and bowling teams. The Comets compete in the Cascades Conference with Michigan Center, Napoleon, Vandercook Lake, Addison, East Jackson, Grass Lake, and Manchester.

References

External links
Hanover High School Home Page

Educational institutions established in 1874
Public high schools in Michigan
Schools in Jackson County, Michigan
1874 establishments in Michigan